The Water Tribunal of the plain of Valencia, also known as the Tribunal of Waters, is an institution of justice to settle disputes arising from the use of irrigation water by farmers in several Irrigation Communities and canals (Quart, Benàger i Faitanar, Tormos, Mislata, Mestalla, Favara, Rascanya, Rovella and Xirivella) in the Horta de València. It is the World’s Oldest Court and  the oldest democratic institution in Europe.

In 2009 it was chosen along with the Council of Wise Men of the plain of Murcia as intangible cultural heritage by UNESCO.

Proceedings of the Tribunal
The Tribunal is a customary court. It consists of one representative, called síndic (syndic), from each of the Irrigation Communities—nine in total—and one among them is elected president for a period of two years. Every Thursday the Tribunal meets in public and an administrative session at the Casa Vestidor at the Plaça de la Mare de Déu of Valencia to discuss various issues, mainly the distribution of water. On public holidays that fall on a Thursday, the Water Court meets on the preceding Wednesday. That is when the bailiff, with the permission of the president, calls for cases from each of the canals in turn, with the traditional phrase "denunciants de la séquia de...!" ("claimants from the irrigation canal of...!"). The trial takes place quickly and is completely in Valencian.

Each complainant puts his case before the Tribunal and then the accused defends himself and answers questions. It is then when the Tribunal, with the exception of the trustee of the canal in question (to ensure fairness) decides the guilt of the defendant, and if so found, it is the trustee of the canal who imposes the penalty for the offender, according to the Bylaws of the Irrigation Communities. The court is purely oral—there is nothing done in writing and no records are kept.

History

The Tribunal's origin is not fully known, although it is likely to have evolved from previous Andalusian traditions. Some historians, such as José Vicente Gómez Bayarri, placed its origins in Roman times.

The most widespread theory is advocated by Francisco Javier Borrull. His hypothesis is that there was already a precedent in Roman times, but the foundation as it operates today occurred during the reigns of the Caliphs Abd-ar-Rahman III and Al-Hakam II, specifically in 960CE. Borrull's reason was that during the reign of these two Caliphs there was an era of complete peace on the Iberian peninsula and, as a result, it must have been founded then. In fact, the millennial anniversary of the founding of the Water Tribunal took place in 1960, led by Vicente Giner Boira, legal adviser to the Tribunal at the time, and leading proponent of this theory in the twentieth century.

See also
Council of Wise Men of the plain of Murcia

References

External links

Official Tribunal website. 
UNESCO website. Description.
Vicente Giner Boira Archive (Biblioteca Valenciana)

Intangible Cultural Heritage of Humanity
Province of Valencia
Agricultural organisations based in Spain
Irrigation in Spain